The Free World  is a 2016 American drama film directed by Jason Lew. It was shown in the U.S. Dramatic Competition section at the 2016 Sundance Film Festival.

Plot
Martin "Mohamed" Lundy (Boyd Holbrook) has been released by the efforts of the Innocence Project after at least 17 years in  Amgola prison and is working at Second Chance animal shelter run by Linda Workman (Octavia Spencer) in Louisiana. A badly injured dog is brought in by Doris Lamb (Elisabeth Moss) and her unsympathetic husband John, a police officer. The dog is put down due to his injuries. Doris comes back to the shelter incapable of caring for herself. Mohamed takes her in without anyone knowing about it. He learns that Doris' husband has been killed and his wife is a person of interest. Law enforcement look to Mohamed to provide the information needed to solve the murder. Mohamed and Doris grow to respect each other. No one is aware that she is holing up at Mohamed's.

Doris imagines she sees her dog outside Mohamed's apartment, and while going after it locks herself out. Mohamed comes home to find her waiting at the door subsequently, their thoughts are that law enforcement will capture them, so they go on the run. They make contact with Mohamed's friend from prison, who takes him to someone that will take them to safety, but are themselves held captive. They escape, are stopped on the highway by law enforcement, and are captured after a stand-off. Mohamed reaches for something, law enforcement shoots him, and from out of his pocket drops prayer beads.

Mohamed survives his injuries, and visits Doris while she is serving her prison sentence for the killing of her husband. It is not clear whether or not she has been convicted of manslaughter or murder.

Cast
 Boyd Holbrook as Martin "Mohamed" Lundy
 Elisabeth Moss as Doris Lamb
 Octavia Spencer as Linda Workman
 Sung Kang as Detective Shin
 Sue-Lynn Ansari as Diner Waitress
 James Moses Black as Officer Smith

Critical response
On review aggregator website Rotten Tomatoes, the film has rating of 50%, based on 18 reviews, with an average rating of 5.1/10. On Metacritic the film has a score of 46 out of 100 score, based on 5 critics, indicating "mixed or average reviews".

References

External links
 
 
 

2016 films
2016 drama films
American drama films
2010s English-language films
2010s American films